Anthony George Franciosa (né Papaleo; October 25, 1928 – January 19, 2006) was an American actor most often billed as Tony Franciosa at the height of his career. He began his career on stage and made a breakthrough portraying the brother of the drug addict in the play A Hatful of Rain, which earned him a nomination for the Tony Award for Best Featured Actor in a Play. He reprised his role in its subsequent film adaptation, for which he won the 1957 Venice Film Festival Award for Best Actor, and was nominated for the Academy Award for Best Actor in a Leading Role. 

After relocating to Hollywood he made numerous feature films, including A Face in the Crowd (1957), The Long, Hot Summer (1958), and Career (1959), for which he won the Golden Globe for Best Actor. In television, he played lead roles in five television series: the sitcom Valentine's Day (1964–65), drama The Name of the Game (1968–71), Search (1972–73), Matt Helm (1975), and Finder of Lost Loves (1984). Later in his career, he acted primarily in Europe, starring in the erotic drama The Cricket (1980) and Dario Argento's giallo Tenebrae (1982).

Early life
He was born in the Little Italy district of New York to an Italian-American family. His grandparents emigrated from Melfi, Basilicata, in the center of the boot of Southern Italy, in 1890. His parents separated when he was one and he was raised by his mother and aunt, adopting his mother's maiden name Franciosa.

After high school he worked as a welder, ship steward and cook. At the age of 18 he was doing free dancing lessons at the YMCA. They offered him a role in a production of The Seagull and the experience made him want to be an actor.

Career

Theatre
Franciosa studied privately for two years with Joseph Geigler. He got a four-year scholarship at the Dramatic Workshop which led to the New York Repertory Theatre.

In 1948, Franciosa joined the Cherry Lane Theatre Group off Broadway (at the same time as actress Bea Arthur). Within two years, he had been accepted as a member of the Actors Studio, which would prove an invaluable resource throughout his career but it would be a few years more before Franciosa could make a living from acting. In the meantime, he accepted a variety of jobs which included being a waiter, dishwasher, day laborer, and messenger boy at CBD. He worked in Theatre of the Sky on Lake Tahoe. In 1950 he was in a San Francisco production of Detective Story.

In 1953, Franciosa made his Broadway debut in End as a Man alongside Ben Gazzara, and the following year in Wedding Breakfast (1954).

Franciosa began guest starring on TV shows such as Studio One in Hollywood, Kraft Theatre, Ford Star Jubilee (an adaptation of This Happy Breed with Noël Coward), and Goodyear Playhouse.

A Hatful of Rain
Franciosa's breakthrough role came when cast in the Actors Studio production of A Hatful of Rain (1955–56) under the direction of Elia Kazan. He played Polo, the brother of the drug addicted Johnny (Ben Gazzara). Shelley Winters played Gazzara's wife and she would marry Franciosa the following year. Franciosa was nominated for a Tony Award for his performance.

Franciosa made his film debut in Elia Kazan's A Face in the Crowd (1957) alongside Andy Griffith, Patricia Neal, and Lee Remick.

He followed it in MGM's This Could Be the Night (1957) as the romantic interest for Jean Simmons, under the direction of Robert Wise.

Franciosa reprised his role in A Hatful of Rain in the film version, directed by Fred Zinnemann at 20th Century Fox, with Don Murray and Eva Marie Saint playing the roles originated by Gazzara and Winters. Hedda Hopper pointed out that these three films were made before the first one had been released.
Franciosa's performance in Hatful of Rain earned him an Academy Award nomination for Best Actor.

Film star
Franciosa supported Anna Magnani and Anthony Quinn in Wild Is the Wind (1957) directed by George Cukor, produced by Hal B. Wallis who put Franciosa under a multi-film contract.

He then appeared with Paul Newman and Joanne Woodward in The Long Hot Summer (1958), playing one of the two sons of Orson Welles, directed by Martin Ritt at Fox.

In December 1957, he spent 10 days in jail for hitting a press photographer in April of that year. However he was much in demand: In an interview in December, he said he owed Fox and MGM three films each over five years, Kazan two more films, and Hal Wallis one film a year over seven years.

He played Francisco Goya in MGM's The Naked Maja (1958) with Ava Gardner, which earned Franciosa $250,000 in acting fees due to production delays. He made a second film for Wallis, Career (1959) with Dean Martin and Shirley MacLaine, then The Story on Page One (1959) with Rita Hayworth for Clifford Odets at Fox.

He was meant to star in Orpheus Descending (which became The Fugitive Kind) with Anna Magnani, but the producers decided to cast Marlon Brando, and Franciosa was paid out $75,000. He was mentioned as a possibility for one of the roles in The Magnificent Seven and for the title role in a proposed Simon Bolivar biopic that Dino De Laurentiis was going to make.

In 1959, he served 30 days at an open-prison farm for possession of marijuana. The same year, he was in a car accident.

Franciosa returned to TV to appear in Heaven Can Wait an adaptation of Here Comes Mr Jordan (1960), then in Cradle Song (1960).

He supported Gina Lollobrigida in MGM's Go Naked in the World (1961), which lost money. He was top-billed in the Italian Careless (1962) with Claudia Cardinale and MGM's Period of Adjustment (1962) with Jane Fonda, Franciosa's first film for that studio which made a profit. In August 1963, he addressed a race rally in Alabama alongside Marlon Brando and Paul Newman.

Television

Franciosa guest starred on The DuPont Show of the Week, Arrest and Trial, Breaking Point, The Greatest Show on Earth, and Bob Hope Presents the Chrysler Theatre. He had support parts in two films for Fox: Rio Conchos (1964) with Stuart Whitman and Richard Boone, and The Pleasure Seekers (1964) with Ann-Margret and Carol Lynley.

He starred in a TV series Valentine's Day (1964–65). When that ended he had support parts in A Man Could Get Killed (1966) with James Garner and Assault on a Queen (1966) with Frank Sinatra. He was leading man to Ann-Margret in The Swinger (1966) at Paramount and Raquel Welch in Fathom (1967) at Fox.

In a 1966 interview he confessed that Hollywood stardom had come a little too early: "It was an incredible amount of attention, and I wasn't quite mature enough psychologically or emotionally for it."

He starred in a phenomenally highly rated TV movie, billed on countless lead-up commercials as the first movie made for television, Universal's Fame Is the Name of the Game (1966), then a spaghetti Western at Universal, A Man Called Gannon (1968), a drama with Jacqueline Bisset at Fox, The Sweet Ride (1968), and a war film at Universal, In Enemy Country (1968).

Producer David Dortort was on the verge of casting him as Cameron Mitchell's best friend and brother-in-law, Manolito Montoya, on the western, The High Chaparral, if Henry Darrow did not make it to the set in time. Darrow did.

Tony Franciosa returned to regular series with The Name of the Game (1968–71) (based on Fame Is the Name of the Game), as lead role of charismatic but doggedly determined star reporter Jeff Dillon, alternating the regular lead spot with Gene Barry and Robert Stack. The three leading actors were never onscreen at the same time at any point in the series. He was fired from the show in 1970 because of his temper.

He was in Web of the Spider (1971), an Italian horror film, then a series of TV movies: The Deadly Hunt (1971), Earth II (1971), and The Catcher (1972). He had a support part in the action film Across 110th Street (1972).

Franciosa had a further alternating lead role in a TV series, this time alongside Hugh O'Brian and Doug McClure, as agent Nick Bianco in Search (1972). When that ended he supported Peter Sellers in Ghost in the Noonday Sun (1973), then had support roles in This Is the West That Was (1974) for TV and The Drowning Pool (1975) with Paul Newman.

He had his own series with Matt Helm (1975), a television version of the spy-spoof theatrical films that starred Dean Martin, but it only lasted 14 episodes.

He was in Curse of the Black Widow (1977), a television miniseries Aspen (1977) with Sam Elliott, Wheels (1978), Firepower (1979), The World Is Full of Married Men (1979), The Cricket (1980), Help Me to Dream (1981), an episode of Tales of the Unexpected, Side Show (1981), Death Wish II (1982), Kiss My Grits (1982), Tenebrae (1982) from Dario Argento, Julie Darling (1983), and an episode of Masquerade. In his memoir, From I Love Lucy to Shōgun and Beyond: Tales from the Other Side of the Camera, Jerry London stated that Franciosa could not remember his lines during the shooting of the television movie Wheels, so co-star Rock Hudson had to hold up cue cards for him during one scene in a car.

Later career
Franciosa starred in the Aaron Spelling-produced series Finder of Lost Loves (1984–85). He could be seen in Stagecoach (1986) and episodes of Hotel, The Love Boat, and Jake and the Fatman.

In the 1985 revival of The Twilight Zone, he appeared in the third-season episode "Crazy as a Soup Sandwich," playing a gangster who is revealed to be the ultimate demon.

Later performances included Blood Vows: The Story of a Mafia Wife (1987), Death House (1988), Fashion Crime (1989), Ghost Writer (1989), Backstreet Dreams (1990), and Double Threat (1992). In 1990–91, he portrayed Colonel Doctor Otternschlag in the U.S. national tour of the musical Grand Hotel at the Kennedy Center in Washington, D.C., and other national tour locations.

Franciosa's final film was City Hall, a 1996 drama starring Al Pacino and John Cusack, in which he portrayed a crime boss.

In his autobiography The Garner Files, actor James Garner stated that Franciosa, on the set of A Man Could Get Killed, constantly abused the stunt crew by not pulling punches in fight scenes, resulting in a physical confrontation with Garner.

Personal life
Franciosa was married four times, and had three children. His first marriage to writer Beatrice Bakalyar in 1952 ended in divorce in 1957. That May 4, he married actress Shelley Winters; the couple divorced in 1960.

He next wed the former Judith Balaban, daughter of Barney Balaban, and author of the book The Bridesmaids about her friend Princess Grace of Monaco, in whose wedding she served as a bridesmaid. This union produced Franciosa's only daughter, Nina.

His fourth and final marriage was to Rita Theil on November 27, 1970 -- coincidentally, the day his final episode of The Name Of The Game aired. The marriage lasted until his death in 2006. The pair had two sons, organic farmer Marco and actor Christopher.

When asked about Franciosa's hair-trigger temper, Theil said "He was never taught how to control his temper ... I changed him a lot ... We still have good fights once in a while, but I can scream back at him."

Franciosa, reflecting about Thiel's influence on him, said
 "It took years of therapy and simply living through things to finally accept and enjoy myself. My wife Rita's influence has been profound in that process. Her family was a product of The Great Disaster — World War II. She emerged from the flames with a remarkable buoyancy. Each day she rises with an optimism, a serenity toward life that is certainly contagious. Does that sound romantic? If so, so be it."

During his later years, Franciosa lived in the Brentwood neighborhood of Los Angeles. He died on January 19, 2006, at age 77 at nearby UCLA Medical Center after suffering a massive stroke.

Selected filmography

 This Could Be the Night (1957) - Tony Armotti
 A Face in the Crowd (1957) - Joey DePalma
 A Hatful of Rain (1957) - Polo Pope
 Wild Is the Wind (1957) - Bene
 The Long, Hot Summer (1958) - Jody Varner
 The Naked Maja (1958) - Francisco Jose De Goya
 Career (1959) - Sam Lawson
 The Story on Page One (1959) - Victor Santini
 Go Naked in the World (1961) - Nick Stratton
 Careless (1962) - Emilio Brentani
 Period of Adjustment (1962) - Ralph Bates
 Rio Conchos (1964) - Rodriguez
 The Pleasure Seekers (1964) - Emilio Lacayo
 A Man Could Get Killed (1966) - Steve / Antonio
 Assault on a Queen (1966) - Vic Rossiter
 The Swinger (1966) - Ric Colby
 Fame Is the Name of the Game (1966) - Jeff Dillon
 Fathom (1967) - Peter Merriwether
 A Man Called Gannon (1968) - Gannon
 The Sweet Ride (1968) - Collie Ransom
 In Enemy Country (1968) - Charles
 Web of the Spider (1971) - Alan Foster
 Earth II (1971) - Frank Karger
 Across 110th Street (1972) - Nick D'Salvio
 Search (1972–1973) - Nick Bianco
 Ghost in the Noonday Sun (1973) - Pierre Rodriguez
 The Drowning Pool (1975) - Broussard
 Curse of the Black Widow (1977) - Mark Higbie
 Firepower (1979) - Dr. Charles Félix
 The World Is Full of Married Men (1979) - David Cooper
 The Cricket (1980) - Annibale Meneghetti, detto Ulisse
 Help Me Dream (1981) - Ray
 Death Wish II (1982) - Herman Baldwin, LA Police Commissioner
 Kiss My Grits (1982) - Charlie Karkas
 Tenebrae (1982) - Peter Neal
 Julie Darling (1983) - Harold Wilding
 Blood Vows: The Story of a Mafia Wife (1987) - Lou Di Luca
 Zombie Death House (1987) - Vic Moretti
 La morte è di moda (1989) - Commissioner Rizzo
 Ghost Writer (1989) - Vincent Carbone
 Backstreet Dreams (1990) - Angelo
 Double Threat (1993) - Crocker Scott
 El caçador furtiu (1995) - Walter
 City Hall (1996) - Paul Zapatti

Awards and nominations

References

External links 

 
 
 

1928 births
2006 deaths
20th-century American male actors
American male film actors
American male stage actors
American male television actors
Best Drama Actor Golden Globe (film) winners
Volpi Cup for Best Actor winners
Activists for African-American civil rights
Male actors from New York City
American people of Italian descent
People from Brentwood, Los Angeles
Balaban family